Giuseppe Micheli (1874–1948) was an Italian notary and politician who was a member of the Christian Democracy party. He served in different ministerial posts in the 1920s and 1940s.

Biography
Micheli was born in Parma on 19 October 1874. He was a notary by profession. In 1902 Micheli joined the first movement of Christian Democracy. He became a member of the Italian Parliament in 1908. He was the minister of agriculture in the cabinet of Prime Minister Francesco Saverio Nitti between May and June 1920 and in the next cabinet led by Giovanni Giolitti in the period 1920-1921. Next Micheli was the minister of public works in the cabinet of Ivanoe Bonomi between 1921 and 1922. 

Micheli was the minister of navy in the cabinet of Alcide De Gasperi in the period 1946–1947. He served at the Italian Senate from 1948. He was also vice president of the Chamber of Deputies chaired by Vittorio Emanuele Orlando. 

Micheli married Lucia Basetti, a daughter of the deputy Gian Lorenzo Basetti in 1903. He died in Rome on 17 October 1948. One of their children was Michele Micheli who was also a notary and jurist.

References

External links

1874 births
1948 deaths
Italian Ministers of Defence
Politicians from Parma
Members of the Italian Senate
Italian Ministers of Public Works
Agriculture ministers of Italy
Christian Democracy (Italy) politicians
Italian notaries